Valentin Sandu (born 28 February 1983) is a Romanian former footballer who played as a left back for teams such as Progresul București, Astra Ploiești or Farul Constanța, among others.

References

External links
 

1983 births
Living people
Sportspeople from Ploiești
Romanian footballers
Association football defenders
Liga I players
Liga II players
FC Progresul București players
FC Astra Giurgiu players
FCV Farul Constanța players
CSO Plopeni players